This is a list of the German Media Control Top 100 Singles Chart number-ones of 1983.

References

 German Singles Chart Archives from 1956
 Media Control Chart Archives from 1960

1983 in Germany
Germany
1983